Obed Crosby Haycock (1901–1983) was a scientist and educator.  He was born in Panguitch, Utah on October 5, 1901.  He received his B.S. in Electrical Engineering from the University of Utah in 1925.  He also had studied at Utah State University.  He received a master of Science from Purdue University in 1931.  He was a research Engineer at Rutgers University from 1944-1945.  He became the Director of Upper Air Research labs at the University of Utah in 1957.  He started a radio station KLGN in Logan, Utah in 1954 which he later sold.

His research involved the upper atmosphere including the ionosphere/magnetosphere which is involved in diverse phenomena including the Aurora Borealis, weather patterns, and radio transmission.  He did much of his research for the Army and later the Airforce.  He used captured German V-2 rockets for his investigations and later he used improved rocketry produced by the U.S. He was present during the detonation of the nuclear weapon at Bikini Atoll where he observed the effects of such on the ionosphere.

He was a recipient of the Outstanding Engineer Award from the University of Utah.  He was a fellow of IEEE.  He was a member of the Sigma Xi and  Tau Beta Pi.

He wrote and contributed to many professional publications.  This included an article on the coming of electrical power to Utah for the Utah Historical Quarterly.

Obed Crosby Haycock had five children with his first wife, Martha Mary Harding:  Jean Haycock, Don H. Haycock, Ralph Hugh Haycock, Richard Haycock and Lois Haycock.

In 1964 Haycock married Ellen Lyon (née Smith).

Sources

External links
Descendants of Hannah Bunker

University of Utah alumni
1901 births
1983 deaths
Rutgers University faculty
Utah State University alumni
University of Utah faculty
Purdue University alumni
Bikini Atoll
American nuclear test sites
American nuclear weapons testing
Fellow Members of the IEEE
People from Panguitch, Utah